Samm Bennett is an American singer-songwriter and multi-instrumentalist.

Samm Bennett is a singer and songwriter, a drummer and percussionist, and a player of string instruments such as the stick dulcimer (sometimes called a dulcitar) and the diddley bow. He also works occasionally in electronic music, using synthesizers, WaveDrum, effects and various toys and gadgets. He is also a player of the Đàn môi (Vietnamese jaw harp), as well as the mouth bow. His musical activities include membership in several different bands, all based in Tokyo, where he resides. He is also a solo performer.

References

External links
Official homepage, Polarity Records

American singer-songwriters
Free improvisation
Living people
20th-century American drummers
American male drummers
20th-century American male musicians
Year of birth missing (living people)
American male singer-songwriters